In mathematics, more specifically in numerical linear algebra, the biconjugate gradient method is an algorithm to solve systems of linear equations

Unlike the conjugate gradient method, this algorithm does not require the matrix  to be self-adjoint, but instead one needs to perform multiplications by the conjugate transpose .

The Algorithm

 
 
 
 
 for  do
 
 
 
 
 
 
 
 

In the above formulation, the computed  and  satisfy

Unpreconditioned version of the algorithm 
 Choose initial guess ,
 
 
 
 
 for  do

Discussion
The biconjugate gradient method is numerically unstable (compare to the biconjugate gradient stabilized method), but very important from a theoretical point of view. Define the iteration steps by

where  using the related projection

with

These related projections may be iterated themselves as

The new directions

are then orthogonal to the residuals:

which themselves satisfy

where .

The biconjugate gradient method now makes a special choice and uses the setting

Properties

The algorithm thus produces projections onto the Krylov subspace.

See also
 Biconjugate gradient stabilized method
 Conjugate gradient method

References
 
 

Numerical linear algebra
Gradient methods